Are You Driving Me Crazy? is the third album by Seam. It was released in 1995 through Touch and Go Records. The band promoted the album by touring with aMiniature and Versus.

Production
The album was primarily produced by Brad Wood.

Critical reception
The Chicago Reader called the album "a bleak statement of emotional strain embodied by guitars that mewl with melancholy, bitterness, and unsure resolve." The Chicago Tribune noted that "the edgy guitar textures overlap with the understated melancholy in [Sooyoung] Park's voice and lyrics, a reflection of a tumultuous year that ended with a pressure-packed recording schedule." The Gazette stated: "Nothing new to this kind of ache-based grandeur, but Seam's languorous guitar noise serves its songs, and not the other way around."

Track listing

Personnel 
Seam
Chris Manfrin – drums
Sooyoung Park – vocals, guitar
Reg Schrader – guitar
William Shin – bass guitar
Production and additional personnel
Bundy K. Brown – EBow on "Port of Charleston" and "Haole Redux"
Jeff Divine – photography
Julie Liu – trumpet, violin and backing vocals on "Rainy Season" and "Tuff Luck"
Casey Rice – recording on "Tuff Luck" and "Sometimes I Forget"
Brad Wood – recording

References

External links 
 

1995 albums
Seam (band) albums
albums produced by Brad Wood
Touch and Go Records albums